Acacia pulviniformis is a shrub of the genus Acacia and the subgenus Phyllodineae that is endemic to south western Australia.

Description
The short, spiny and straight branchlets are either obscurely ribbed or ribless. It blooms from August to October and produces yellow flowers.

Taxonomy
The species was first formally described by the botanists Joseph Maiden and William Blakely in 1928 as part of the work Descriptions of fifty new species and six varieties of western and northern Australian Acacias, and notes on four other species as published in the Journal of the Royal Society of Western Australia. It was reclassified as Racosperma pulviniforme by Leslie Pedley in 2003 then transferred back to the genus Acacia in 2006. The often confused with and misidentified as Acacia oxyclada.

Distribution
It is native to an area in the Wheatbelt and Great Southern regions of Western Australia from around Corrigin in the north to Mount Barker in the south and is found in damp low-lying areas growing in sandy, clay or loamy soils often with lateritic gravel and is usually a part of open Eucalyptus wandoo woodland communities or in disturbed areas.

See also
List of Acacia species

References

pulviniformis
Acacias of Western Australia
Plants described in 1928
Taxa named by Joseph Maiden
Taxa named by William Blakely